Gerard van Wieringhen Borski (29 January 1800 in Vleuten — 2 February 1869 in Delft) was a Dutch educator, academic, and linguist. His nonfiction books covered the domains of linguistics, math, history, and sociology.

Books
 Disputatio historica inauguralis, de Phoenicum Coloniis (J. Altheer, 1825)
 Blik op den verledenen, tegenwoordigen en toekomenden toestand des vaderlands (Van de Velde Olivier, 1831; with a poem by Joost Berman)
 Handleiding tot de mythologie : voor het onderwys in de gymnasien (Van de Velde Olivier, 1837; Leepel, 1854)
 Aan mijne stadgenooten bij de herstelling van het stedel. gymnasium (Amsterdam, 1839)
 Redevoeringen over het verband tusschen de Nederlandsche letterkunde en het Nederlandsche volkskarakter (Delft, 1843)
 Handleiding tot het aanvankelijk onderwijs in de cijferkunst (Du Mortier en Zoon, 1844)
 Geschiedenis des vaderlands: een leesboek in XLVIII afdeelingen (Ten Brink & De Vries, 1845)
 Geschiedenis der Israëliten: een leesboek in XLVIII afdeelingen (J. de Rooij, 1846)
 Handleiding tot de theoretische beoefening van den Nederlandschen prozastijl (Bohn, 1848)
 Wegwijzer bij de zinsontleding (Delft, 1852)
 Beknopt leerboek voor het aanvankelijk onderwijs in de moedertaal (Koster, 1853)
 Het grondig taalonderwijs verdedigd tegen Dr. J. Pijnappel Gz. van de Delftsche Akademie (Delft, 1855)
 Handleiding voor de praktische oefening in de zinsontleding (H. Koster, 1856)
 Vier punten, rakende het ontwerp van wet tot regeling van het middelbaar onderwijs (H. Koster, 1862)
 Met Oranje, Nederland; door Oranje, de Nederlandsche volksvrijheid (H.A.M. Roelants, 1864; Gebrs. Koster, 1875)

References

External links
Gerard van Wieringhen Borski at the Dutch Biographic Portal

1800 births
1869 deaths
19th-century Dutch educators
19th-century Dutch writers
19th-century Dutch male writers
19th-century linguists
People from Vleuten-De Meern
People from Delft